Buek is a surname. Notable people with the surname include:

Charles Buek (died 1931), American developer and architect 
Dick Buek (1929–1957), American downhill ski racer and later a daredevil stunt pilot
Otto Buek (1873–1966), German philosopher and translator

See also
Bük